Idrettslaget Molde-Olymp is a Norwegian sports club from Molde, founded in 1971 as a merger between Molde FIL and SK Olymp. It has sections for athletics and speed skating.

As a stadium IL Molde-Olymp uses Molde idrettspark, the former home ground of football club Molde FK.

Its most prominent former member is Simon Rønsholm Sandvik, Otto Berg, winner of the silver medal in long jump at the 1934 European Championships in Athletics. Karen Fladset, Oddrun Hokland and Hilde Hovdenak represented the club (including predecessor clubs) in their early careers.

External links
Official site

Athletics clubs in Norway
Sport in Molde
Sports clubs established in 1971
1971 establishments in Norway